George B. Wooldridge was the business manager of the first blackface minstrel troupe, the Virginia Minstrels, in the mid-19th century. He sometimes went by the name Tom Quick.

References
Day, Charles (1996). "Fun in Black". Inside the Minstrel Mask: Readings in Nineteenth-Century Blackface Minstrelsy. Hanover, New Hampshire: Wesleyan University Press.

Blackface minstrel managers and producers
Year of death missing
Year of birth missing